The India women's national 3x3 team is a national basketball team of India, governed by the Basketball Federation of India. It represents the country in international 3x3 (3 against 3) women's basketball competitions.

FIBA Asia Cup
2013 – 
2017 – 4th

See also
India men's national 3x3 team
India women's national basketball team

References

Under
Women's national 3x3 basketball teams